John Thorpe (c. 1565–c. 1655) was an English architect.

John Thorpe or Thorp may also refer to:

John Thorp (1912–1992), aeronautical engineer
John Thorp (researcher) (1927–2017), New Zealand chemistry lecturer and trans pioneer
John Thorpe (antiquarian, 1682–1750), English physician and antiquarian
John Thorpe (antiquarian, 1715–1792), his son, English antiquarian
John Thorp (colonial administrator) (1912–1961), Governor of Seychelles
John Thorp (MP for Gloucestershire), MP for Gloucestershire
John Thorpe (MP for Surrey), MP for Surrey
John Thorp (physician) (born 1957/1958), American obstetrician and gynecologist
John Thorpe (priest) (1855–1932), Archdeacon of Macclesfield, father of John Henry Thorpe
John Thorp, son of Holden Thorp
John A. Thorpe (born 1936), American mathematician
John Henry Thorpe (1887–1944), British Conservative politician
John M. Thorpe (1890–1956), American college football player and coach
Jack Thorpe (1881–?), American football player
John Thorpe, a character in Jane Austen's Northanger Abbey